Ólafur Helgi Kristjánsson (born 20 May 1968) is an Icelandic football manager and former player, who most recently managed Danish club Esbjerg fB.

Playing career
Kristjánsson started his playing career at FH Hafnarfjörður, before moving to KR Reykjavík in 1996. In 1996, he moved to Danish side AGF Aarhus. He retired in 2001 and became a youth coach at the team, and later assistant manager.

Managerial career

Kristjánsson took charge of Icelandic premier league team Fram on 30 June 2004, replacing Ion Geolgău. The club was bottom of the league when Kristjánsson took over, but eventually the club managed to avoid relegation. Kristjánsson was in charge again for the 2005 season, but left the club after relegation.

On 6 July 2006 Kristjánsson was appointed manager of Breiðablik UBK, finishing the season in 5th place. Over the next few years the club went to become a regular title contender. In 2009 the club won its first big title in history with a win in the Icelandic Cup. The following year the team won the Icelandic Premier League for the first time.

In April 2014 it was announced that Kristjánsson would take over as head coach of FC Nordsjælland in July 2014. He led the club to a 6th place in his first season as manager. On 15 December he was sacked following a takeover of the club.

In the summer of 2016 he became new manager of Randers FC in the Danish Superliga. He managed the club until October 2017, when he left by mutual consent.

Managerial statistics

Includes games played in Icelandic Premier League, Icelandic Cup, Icelandic League Cup, Icelandic Super Cup, Europa League and Champions League.

Honours

Manager
Breiðablik UBK
Úrvalsdeild (1): 2010
Icelandic Cup (1): 2009
Icelandic League Cup (1): 2013

References

1968 births
Living people
Olafur Kristjansson
Olafur Kristjansson
Olafur Kristjansson
Olafur Kristjansson
Olafur Kristjansson
Expatriate men's footballers in Denmark
Olaufr Kristjansson
Olafur Kristjansson
Aarhus Gymnastikforening players
Olafur Kristjansson
FC Nordsjælland managers
Randers FC managers
Danish Superliga managers
Olafur Kristjansson
Úrvalsdeild karla (football) managers
Association football defenders